Anthahpuram is a 1998 Indian Telugu-language action drama film, written and directed by Krishna Vamsi, and produced by P. Kiran under the Anandi Art Creations banner. The film stars Jagapathi Babu, Soundarya, Prakash Raj, Sai Kumar and Saradha, with music composed by Ilaiyaraaja. Inspired from 1991 American film Not Without My Daughter (1991),  the plot revolves around a newly-married NRI woman finding herself in a traditionally feudal family in the Rayalaseema region of Andhra Pradesh.

The film has won nine Nandi Awards and three Filmfare Awards South including Best Film – Telugu. The film was later remade in 1999 in Tamil with the same name with Parthiban replacing Jagapathi Babu and it was remade in Hindi as Shakti: The Power (2003).

Plot 
The film begins in Mauritius where Bhanumati / Bhanu a naughty girl resides with her uncle Bobby. Prakash an orphan is acquainted with Bhanu, they couple up and are shortly blessed with a baby boy Raja. Once Prakash hears that an act of violence took place in his hometown in Rayalaseema, he tries to contact his mother through a letter, but fails. So, he rushes to India along with his wife and kid. Bhanu understands that Prakash has hidden his true identity, that he belonged to an extremely feudal society. His father Narasimha is a powerful factionist. Since Prakash couldn't bear the savagery in that society, he had migrated to Mauritius.

As soon as the pair lands, Narasimha's foes try to kill Prakash. They almost succeed when, Narasimha's aides counter-attack and rescue them. They are taken home to Prakash's ancestral home where Bhanu is repulsed and frightened seeing the violent culture of Narasimha and his men. She actively hinders Narasimha's attempts to get to know his grandson. She finds solace in the company of her mother-in-law who showers her, Prakash and Raja with utmost affection. After a while, Prakash decides to go back. He hands their passports over to his best friend, Inspector Chinna and tells him to make their travel arrangements back to Mauritius.

Narasimha is invited to attend a wedding ceremony but, Prakash goes instead. On his way there, the antagonists attack Prakash and kill him. Learning this information, Bhanu quickly packs up, fearing the safety of her child. However, she stops at the request of her mother-in-law who requests her to at least stay till Prakash's funeral. Narasimha refuses to give up the child as he needs an heir to take a vendetta for his son's death. Bhanu is distraught, protests and makes several attempts to escape. Hence she is imprisoned in their house.

Meanwhile, Sarai Veeraraju, a petty thief does various crimes to achieve his life ambition of living in Dubai. Bhanu absconds with the aid of her mother-in-law. She collects their passports and tickets from Chinna when Narasimha's deputies chase her. She coincidentally happens across Veeraraju who protects her from her assailants. Bhanu offers Veeraraju the money he needs to go to Dubai and pleads with him to help her board a train to Hyderabad. Narasimha decides to kill Bhanu and take Raju back when his wife reprimands him, telling him that they too were partially responsible for their son's death, which reforms him. Veeraraju makes a plan on how to get her on the train when Narasimha's enemies ambush them. They are chased by both Narasimha's enemies and acolytes. Veeraraju accomplishes the task and helps her board the train to Hyderabad. But, sadly, dies amidst the violence. At last, Narasimha continues to pursue Bhanu till the airport and catches her before she can get on her flight. But instead of stopping her, asks her to forgive him, allowing her and Raja to leave. Finally, the movie ends with Bhanu forgives Narasimha and Raja says goodbye to his grandfather.

Cast 

 Jagapathi Babu as Sarai Veeraraju
 Soundarya as Bhanumati
 Prakash Raj as Narasimha
 Sai Kumar as Prakash, Bhanumati's husband
 Saradha as Narasimha's wife
 K. Ashok Kumar
 G. V. Sudhakar Naidu
 Ramaraju as Narasimha's henchman
 Dasari Arun Kumar in a cameo appearance
 Chinna
 M. S. Narayana
 Babu Mohan as Bobby
 Raja Babu
 Jagga Rao
 Telangana Shakuntala
 Heera Rajagopal guest appearance in an item number
 Delhi Rajeswari
 Master Krishna Pradeep as Raja (Prakash's son)
 Madhusudhan Rao in an uncredited role

Tamil version
Parthiban as Dubai Pandiyan
Mansoor Ali Khan as Shekhar
 Simran as Radha

Soundtrack 
The film's music was composed by Ilaiyaraaja with lyrics written by Sirivennela Seetharama Sastry and was released by Melody Makers Audio Company.

Reception 
Vishy of Indolink wrote, "Prakash Raj has done a good job in his role as the eccentric village patriarch with an iron heart. Soundarya has done a wonderful job as the mother struggling for the welfare of her son. The director has portrayed her character well, as she transforms from a happy-go-lucky girl to one who is willing to step into a physical fight to save her child."

Accolades

Notes

References

External links 

1998 multilingual films
1990s Tamil-language films
1990s Telugu-language films
1998 action drama films
1998 films
Films directed by Krishna Vamsi
Films scored by Ilaiyaraaja
Indian action drama films
Indian multilingual films
Telugu films remade in other languages